CKTI-FM is a First Nations community radio station in Canada, playing a mixture of country and classic rock broadcasting at 107.7 FM in Kettle Point, Ontario. The station has an alternative country style to its music. The station began broadcasting in 2004 and is owned by Points Eagle Radio Inc.

On August 7, 2007, the station was authorized to add a rebroadcaster (CKCI-FM) in Sarnia on 103.3 FM. CKCI is off the air as of May 2017, with its license revoked March 19, 2019.

References

External links
The Eagle
 

Kti
Kti
Kti
Radio stations established in 2004
2004 establishments in Ontario